Jovan Manović (13 May 1977 – 9 May 2007) was a Croatian professional basketball player.

Playing career
A point guard, Manović played for Split CO and Alkar in Croatia, Kraški zidar and Helios Domžale in Slovenia, Ovarense, Portugal Telecom, and C.A. Queluz in Portugal, JDA Dijon (France), AS Prishtina (Kosovo), and Makedonikos (Greece).

Personal life 
His parents were former basketball player Mihajlo Manović and Hanija Erceg.

Death
Manović was killed in a café on 9 May 2007 in Belgrade, Serbia. An investigation discovered that he was mistakenly killed in a clash between two drug gangs from Belgrade. The real target was supposed to be a close friend of a Serbian drug lord known in Europe.

See also 
 List of basketball players who died during their careers

References

External links
 Player Profile at eurobasket.com
 Player Profile at realgm.com
 Player Profile at proballers.com

1977 births
2007 deaths
2007 murders in Serbia
Basketball players from Split, Croatia
Deaths by firearm in Serbia
Croatian expatriate basketball people in France
Croatian expatriate basketball people in Greece
Croatian men's basketball players
Croatian people of Serbian descent
C.A. Queluz players
JDA Dijon Basket players
KK Split players
Makedonikos B.C. players
Male murder victims
Ovarense Basquetebol players
People murdered in Serbia
Point guards
KK Alkar players